Handiganala is a village in Sidlaghatta Taluk in Chikballapur District of Karnataka State, India
It is located 15 km towards East from District headquarters Chikballapur 2 km from Sidlaghatta 62 km from State capital Bangalore Mallur ( 6 km ), Ablodu ( 7 km ), Devaramallur ( 8 km ), Bannikuppe ( 12 km ), Cheemangala ( 13 km ) are the nearby Villages to Handiganala.
 
Handiganala is surrounded by Vijayapura Taluk towards South, Chikballapur Taluk towards west, Devanhalli Taluk towards South, Chintamani Taluk towards East Sidlaghatta, Vijayapura, Chikkaballapur, Chintamani are the nearby Cities to Handiganala. This Place is in the border of the Chikballapur District and Bangalore Rural District, Bangalore Rural District Vijayapura is South towards this place
 Demographics of Handiganala Kannada is the Local Language here.
 Handiganala LocationTaluk Name : Sidlaghatta
 District : Chikballapur State : Karnataka
 Language : Kannada and English
 Time zone: IST (UTC+5:30)
 Elevation / Altitude: 904 meters. Above Sea level
 Telephone Code / Std Code: 08158

How to teach Handiganala

Train 
Sidlaghatta Rail Way Station are the very nearby railway stations to Handiganala. Chintamani Rail Way Station (near to Chintamani), Chik Ballapur Rail Way Station (near to Chikkaballapur), Nandi Halt Rail Way Station (near to Chikkaballapur), Venkatagirikote Rail Way Station (near to Vijayapura) are the Rail way stations reachable from near by towns. How ever Bangalore Cy Jn Rail Way Station is major railway station 60 km near to Handiganala

Road (Driving) 
 Vijayapura, Chikkaballapur, Chintamani, Bagepalli are the nearby by towns to Handiganala having road connectivity to Handiganala
 Pincodes near Handiganala 562102 ( Melur (Kolar) ), 562105 ( Sidlaghatta ), 562101 ( Chickballapur )
 Nearby Railway Stations
 Sidlaghatta- 3 km  Chik Ballapur- 14 km
 Venkatagiri Kote 14 km

Places near Handiganala 
 Nandi Hills- 20 km
 Bangalore- 59 km
 Lepakshi- 59 km
 Horsley Hills- 75 km
 Shivagange- 79 km
 
 Handiganala Nearby Places
 Few nearby places of Handiganala are listed below for your reference:
 Cities
 Sidlaghatta- 3 km
 Vijayapura- 12 km
 Chikkaballapur- 15 km
 Chintamani- 26 km
 Taluks
 Sidlaghatta- 3 km
 Chikballapur- 14 km
 Devanhalli- 22 km
 Chintamani- 26 km
 Airports
 Bengaluru International Airport- 27 km
 Mysore Airport- 197 km
 Tirupati Airport- 208 km
 Salem Airport- 219 km
 District Headquarters
 Chikballapur- 14 km
 Bangalore Rural- 26 km
 Kolar- 46 km
 Bangalore- 58 km

External links
soki.in, retrieved 1 May 2021

Chikkaballapur district